Vangelis Trigas is a Greek virtuoso soloist and master of the bouzouki. 

He was born 1960 in Argos and began playing the bouzouki during the years of elementary school. He learned to play his first songs from his father, who was an amateur. He is self-taught, and began playing professionally at the age of 15. He has worked with many of the leading Greek singers. During his many collaborations, he concurrently began teaching in 1990. Most of his efforts to date are devoted to the study-research necessary, for the evolution of the bouzouki’s technique and organized curriculum.

Collaborations 
His most important collaborations were with Maria Farantouri in 2004, and George Dalaras in 2007. 

With Maria Farantouri, he had the opportunity to perform at great music venues in many European cities such as the Wiener Konzerthaus in Vienna, the Munich Philharmonic etc. With George Dalaras, he performed at the Odeon of Herodes Atticus, Athens Concert Hall, Thessaloniki Concert Hall, etc.

He has also collaborated in concerts with Mary Linda, Haris Alexiou, Dimitris Mitropanos, Marinela, Manolis Mitsias, Manolis Lidakis and many others.

Discography 
He has recorded three solo albums. Two of them, which are instrumentals that contain studies for the bouzouki are titled, "12 Organika Yia Trihordo Bouzouki(12 instrumentals for the three string bouzouki)" and "Se 3 Horthes (On three Strings)". The third one contains remakes of old popular songs entitled, "Aftoschethiasmi Ke Tragouthia Yia Bouzouki(improvisations and songs for the bouzouki)". 

He has also participated in several albums such as, "Otan Simvi Sta Parix(when it will happen at the Perix)" by George Dalaras, recorded in 2007 at the Odeon of Herodes Atticus, "San Tragoudi magemeno(like an enchanted song)" by George Dalaras, recorded in 2008 at the Concert Hall, "Afstiros Laikon(strictly folk)" by Manolis Lidakis, recorded in 2006, etc. 

Personal discography: 
 2009 - Se 3 Horthes(On three Strings)
 2007 - Aftoschethiasmi Ke Tragouthia Yia Bouzouki(improvisations and songs for the bouzouki) - Masters & The Folk Song Performances - No.1
 2004 - 12 Organika Yia Trihordo Bouzouki(12 instrumentals for the three string bouzouki)

His participations: 
 2011 - Apostolos Chatzichristos - Afieroma(a dedication) - Stavros Avramoglou
 2009 - San Tragoudi magemeno(like an enchanted song) - George Dalaras
 2008 - Tragoudia Me Ousiehs(songs with substances) - George Dalaras
 2007 - Masters & The Folk Song Performances - No.3 - Stavros Tzouanakos
 2007 - Masters & The Folk Song Performances - No.2 - Kostas Kalafatis
 2006 - Afstiros Laikon(strictly folk) - Manolis Lidakis
 2005 - 12 Solistes Mia Foni(twelve soloists one voice) - Zacharias Karounis

Bibliography 
He has published the following books: 

Teaching Methods: 
 No.1 - Method for the three-string bouzouki
 No.2 - Method for the three-string bouzouki
 No.3 - Method for the three-string bouzouki

 
With Scores: 
 No.1 - 18 rembetika & folk songs
 No.2 - 18 rembetika & folk songs
 No.3 - 18 rembetika & folk songs
 No.4 - 18 old folk songs
 No.5 - 23 rembetika & folk songs
 No.6 - 18 old folk songs
 No.7 - 20 artistic & folk songs

Folk Composers:
 No.1 - Markos Vamvakaris

References 
 Press releases from magazines and newspapers
 2010 - MusicHeaven - Interview by Thanasis Gioglou
 2009 - OASIS - Interview by Alexis Vakis
 2009 - DIFONO - Alexis Vakis
 2007 - DIFONO - Kostas Balahoutis
 2006 - HITECH - Harry Sarris
 2005 - TO LAIKO TRAGOUDI - George Kontogiannis
 2005 - METRO - Apostolis Kaparoudakis
 2005 - METRONOMOS - Chronis Platinos
2005 – TA NEA - Panos Geramanis

External links 
 Official site (www.trigas.gr)

1960 births
Living people
Greek musicians
Universal Music Greece artists
People from Argos, Peloponnese